Count Friedrich Wilhelm von Quadt zu Wykradt und Isny (23 December 1818 – 24 October 1892) was a Bavarian politician and diplomat.

Early life
Quadt was born in Isny on 23 December 1818. He was the son of Count Wilhelm Otto Friedrich Albert von Quadt zu Wykradt und Isny and Maria Anna, Countess von Thurn-Valsassina. His elder brother, Bavarian Reichsrat Otto von Quadt-Wykradt-Isny, married Countess Marie von Schönburg-Forderglauchau (a daughter of Alban von Schönburg-Forderglauchau).

He attended high school in Kempten before attending the University of Munich.

Career
 
He served as interim chargé d'affaires in St. Petersburg, Hanover and Paris. In 1848 he was a member of the Pre-Parliament. From 1860, he was Bavarian Envoy in Hanover, from 1867 in Brussels, and from 1868 to 1870 in Paris. In 1871, he was the Bavarian envoy at the peace negotiations in Brussels and signed the protocol to the peace treaty with France in Berlin.

He was a Centre Party member of the German Reichstag from 1874 to 1877 for the constituency of Middle Franconia and from 1881 to 1884 for the constituency of Swabia.

Personal life
On 31 January 1854, he married Sophie van der Mark (1818–1856), widow of the Count of Panisse-Passis and daughter of Jean Baptiste Agapit van der Mark and Etienne de Thiery. Before her death in 1856, they were the parents of:

 Maria Wilhelmine von Quadt-Wykradt-Isny (1854–1914)
 Otto Gebhard Lothar von Quadt-Wykradt-Isny (1856–1928)

He married, secondly, to Marianne, Countess of Rechberg-Rothenlöwen (1834–1910), daughter of Albert von Rechberg (president of the First Chamber of the Estates of Württemberg), in Donzdorf on 1 June 1858. Together, they were the parents of:

  (1859–1925), a writer.
 Elisabeth von Quadt-Wykradt-Isny (1862–1940), who married Carl Ernst Fürst Fugger von Glött, President of the Bavarian Reichsrätekammer.
 Albert Wilhelm Otto von Quadt-Wykradt-Isny (1864–1930), a diplomat who married Amedea de Martino (1874–1933).
 Aloysia von Quadt-Wykradt-Isny (1869–1952), who married Franz von Brühl (1852–1928).

Count Quadt died on 24 October 1892 at Schloss Moos in Lindau on Lake Constance. His widow died there in 1919.

Descendants
Through his daughter Elisabeth, he was a grandfather of Joseph-Ernst Graf Fugger von Glött (1895–1981), a representative of the Christian Social Union of Bavaria who was a member of the Bundestag of Germany between 1949 and 1953 and a member of the Landtag of Bavaria from 1954 to 1962.

References

1818 births
1892 deaths
Ambassadors of Germany to France
Members of the Reichstag of the German Empire